Chae Chan Ping v. United States, 130 U.S. 581 (1889), better known as the Chinese Exclusion Case, was a case decided by the US Supreme Court on May 13, 1889, that challenged the Scott Act of 1888, an addendum to the Chinese Exclusion Act of 1882.

One of the grounds of the challenge was the Act ran afoul of the Burlingame Treaty of 1868. The Supreme Court rejected the challenge and upheld the authority of the US federal government to set immigration policy and to pass new legislation even if it overrode the terms of previous international treaties.

The decision was an important precedent for the Supreme Court's deference to the plenary power of the legislative branch in immigration law and the government's authority to overturn the terms of international treaties. Although the term consular nonreviewability would not be used until the 20th century, the case was cited as a key precedent in the defining cases that established that doctrine. As such, it played an important role in limiting the role of the judiciary in shaping immigration to the United States.

Background 
In 1868, the United States and China agreed to into the Burlingame Treaty, which established formal friendly relations between the two countries and granted China most favored nation status. The treaty encouraged immigration from China and granted some privileges to citizens of either country residing in the other but withheld the privilege of naturalization for immigrants from China.

On November 17, 1880, the treaty was amended to suspend immigration from China. The amendment was called the Treaty Regulating Immigration from China, and historians refer to it as the Angell Treaty of 1880. Its prefix stated: "The United States, because of the constantly increasing immigration of Chinese labourers to the territory of the United States and the embarrassments consequent upon such immigration now desires to negotiate a modification of the existing Treaties which shall not be in direct contravention to their spirit."

In 1882, the Chinese Exclusion Act was passed, forbidding the immigration of skilled and unskilled laborers from China to the United States. The rights of prior immigrants were not significantly amended. An 1884 Amendment to the Chinese Exclusion Act required Chinese citizens to obtain re-entry permits if they wished to return after temporarily leaving the United States. On October 1, 1888, the US government passed the Scott Act. Authored by William Lawrence Scott of Pennsylvania, the act was signed into law by President Grover Cleveland on October 1, 1888. The act forbade re-entry of Chinese immigrants to the United States who would not otherwise be eligible to enter the United States if immigrating for the first time. This went against the privileges that the Burlingame Treaty gave Chinese immigrants to the United States.

Facts 
Chae Chan Ping was a Chinese citizen who had moved to San Francisco, California, in 1875. He worked in the United States from 1875 to June 2, 1887, and left to visit his homeland in China after he had obtained a certificate that would entitle him to return to the United States and had been issued in accordance with provisions of the Chinese Exclusion Act.

On October 1, 1888, while he was outside the United States, the Scott Act became law and forbade his re-entry.

Chae Chan Ping departed on his return journey to the United States on September 7, 1888, from Hong Kong, on the steamship Belgic. On October 8, 1888, the ship landed within the port of San Francisco. He requested entry to the United States and presented his certificate. He was denied entry based on the Scott Act and was detained on board by Captain Walker, the captain of the Belgic.

A writ of habeas corpus was filed on behalf of Ping, who requested for the captain to release him and to allow him to be presented in court. The captain complied, and Ping appeared before the court, which determined that he was being deprived of liberty, and it returned him to the control of the captain. Ping appealed the order, and the case reached the US Supreme Court.

The arguments for the case were heard by on March 28 and 29, 1889. Ping was represented by Thos. D. Riordan, Harvey S. Brown, George Hoadly, and Jas. C. Carter. Geo. A. Johnson, John F. Swift, and Stephen M. White represented the State of California, and Sol. Gen. Jenks represented the US federal government.

Issues 
Several different arguments were made by the lawyers representing Ping, and the Supreme Court's opinion on them would serve an important precedent for future decisions:

 The appeal challenged the authority of the federal legislative and executive branches to overturn international treaties and implicitly claimed that any such overturning was subject to judicial oversight.
 The appeal argued that the right of visitation in a treaty was a form of property protected by the Fifth Amendment.
 The appeal referenced previous criticisms by legal scholars of the constitutionality of the Alien and Sedition Acts, passed in 1798.

Decision 
In its decision published on May 13, 1889, the Supreme Court unanimously upheld the decision of the lower court in an opinion penned by Justice Stephen Johnson Field, who had risen to the position of Supreme Court justice after he had served on the California Supreme Court. Field had pushed back against legislation such as the Pigtail Ordinance, which was de facto discriminatory against the Chinese and so courted unpopularity in California. However, his opinion in this case had rhetoric that was more in line with public sentiment regarding the Chinese at the time and was consistent with his dissent in Chew Heong v. United States, a related challenge to the Chinese Exclusion Act that was decided against the US government.

Field offered a number of reasons for the Supreme Court's decision:

 He clarified that the US government could pass new legislation overriding the terms of past treaties. In that case, the treaty would be treated as valid law only until the new legislation became effective. Although there were no direct precedents in the domain of immigration law, Field cited past precedents involving trade treaties in which the government had changed trade laws, negating the terms of previous treaties, and the courts had rejected appeals challenging the change in law. Examples cited included:
 Taylor v. Morton, 67 U.S. 481 (1862): In this case, the Supreme Court upheld a change in the US tariff structure on hemp that overrode terms of a treaty with Russia.
 Whitney v. Robertson, 124 U.S. 190 (1888): This case upheld the US government's authority to interpret ambiguous treaty terms as it saw fit.
 He noted that when the Burlingame Treaty was amended in 1880, the Chinese government had conceded US authority to regulate immigration from China.
 He noted past precedent in treaties and international diplomatic communication between the United States and other countries, including Switzerland, France, and Mexico and asserted that governments had the authority to regulate immigration in the national interest that existed even when the wisdom of particular decisions was in question.
 He noted that the judiciary was not the right place to appeal any violation of the terms of international treaties but that it was a diplomatic matter for the governments of the respective countries to sort out among themselves.

Relation with other cases

Other Chinese Exclusion Cases 
The case is sometimes called the "Chinese Exclusion Case" on account of being the most important case directly pertaining to the Chinese Exclusion Act. Some commentators use the term "Chinese Exclusion Cases" for a collection of this and four other cases that were decided in the aftermath of the Chinese Exclusion Act:

 Chew Heong v. United States (1884): Heong had lived in the United States and left to visit China before the passage of the Chinese Exclusion Act. An Amendment to the Act in 1884 would require all Chinese in the United States to obtain a re-entry permit prior to departure. Heong, who returned to the United States without a permit, was denied re-entry and appealed the decision. The appeal was granted, and Heong was allowed to re-enter the country. This is the only case of the five that was decided against the US government.
 Chae Chan Ping v. United States (1889) (current page)
 Fong Yue Ting v. United States (1893): The Supreme Court upheld the decision of the United States government to deport Fong Yue Ting and two other Chinese residents who were deemed by the US government to hold no valid residency permits. The decision reaffirmed that the US government's power to deport foreigners is an absolute and unqualified right, just like its power to regulate entry.
 Lem Moon Sing v. United States (1895): The decision by the US Congress in the Geary Act of 1892 was upheld to exclude foreigners from entry without any habeas corpus relief.
 United States v. Ju Toy (1905): The Supreme Court allowed Congress to deny the writ of habeas corpus even to persons claiming to be US citizens.

Another related case that was decided somewhat differently by the Supreme Court is that of United States v. Wong Kim Ark, which held that a person born in the United States of Chinese citizens legally residing there automatically becomes a US citizen. The decision established an important precedent in the Supreme Courts interpretation of the Citizenship Clause of the Fourteenth Amendment.

Value as precedent for later doctrines in immigration law 
In this case and the subsequent Chinese Exclusion Cases, the Supreme Court repeatedly sided with the US government against aliens by offering the rationale that immigration policy and enforcement are matters for the legislative and the executive branches. Some commentators argue that the case was an important precedent in establishing the plenary power doctrine, which immunizes from judicial review the substantive immigration decisions of Congress and the executive branch of the federal government. Others have disagreed about the significance of these cases for plenary power. The defining case for the plenary power doctrine, Knauff v. Shaughnessy (1950), did not explicitly cite the case.

Some commentators have also cited the decisions made in this case as having precedential value for the doctrine of consular nonreviewability, which would emerge in the latter half of the 20th century although it was not a direct precedent, and that term was not yet in use. Although the case did not touch on the authority of US consulates, it arguably addressed similar questions since the task of determining whether an individual would be allowed to enter the United States was then solely undertaken by the officer at the port of entry. By the mid-20th century, the main decision was made by consular officers evaluating visa applications.

The purported significance attached to the case, which was decided at a time of large anti-Chinese sentiment, may have played a role in influencing the court decisions, which have been criticized by commentators and compared to the precedents Dred Scott v. Sandford or Plessy v. Fergusson. Both decisions used reasoning that has been since rejected and are believed to have been influenced by the greater levels of racism existing at the time.

See also 
 List of United States Supreme Court cases, volume 130

References

Sources

External links
 

United States Supreme Court cases
United States Supreme Court cases of the Fuller Court
United States immigration and naturalization case law
1889 in United States case law
Deportation from the United States
China–United States relations
Anti-Chinese sentiment in the United States
Chinese-American culture in San Francisco